The Virtuous Bigamist is a 1956 French-Italian comedy drama film directed by Mario Soldati. It is a remake of the Italian film Four Steps in the Clouds, written by Giuseppe Amato, Alessandro Blasetti, Aldo De Benedetti, Piero Tellini and Cesare Zavattini.

Cast
 Fernandel as Paul Verier
 Giulia Rubini as  Maria
 Fosco Giachetti as  Antonio
 Leda Gloria as  Lucia
 Renato Salvatori as  Gino
 Andrex as  Frederic
 Tina Pica as  Zia Camilla
 Alberto Sordi as  Mario
 Suzet Maïs as Juliette Verdier
 Jean Brochard as the car salesman

References

External links

1956 films
Italian comedy-drama films
French comedy-drama films
1956 comedy-drama films
Films directed by Mario Soldati
Films based on Four Steps in the Clouds
1950s Italian films
1950s French films